Greatest Hits '93–'03 is the first compilation album by 311. It was released on June 8, 2004 on Volcano Entertainment.

Track listing
 "Down" (from 311) – 2:51
 "Flowing" (from Soundsystem) – 3:10
 "All Mixed Up" (from 311) – 2:59
 "Amber" (from From Chaos) – 3:27
 "Come Original" (from Soundsystem) – 3:39
 "Beautiful Disaster" (from Transistor) – 3:58
 "Creatures (For a While)" (from Evolver) – 4:23
 "Do You Right" (from Music) – 4:17
 "I'll Be Here Awhile" (from From Chaos) – 3:26
 "You Wouldn't Believe" (from From Chaos) – 3:41
 "Transistor" (from Transistor) – 3:01
 "Don't Stay Home" (from 311) – 2:42
 "Homebrew" (from Grassroots) (remixed by Chad Sexton) – 3:03
 "Beyond the Gray Sky" (from Evolver) – 4:14
 "Love Song" (cover of The Cure, from the 50 First Dates soundtrack) – 3:26
 "How Do You Feel?" (previously unreleased) – 3:02
 "First Straw" (previously unreleased) – 2:57

Personnel
 Nick Hexum – vocals, guitar
 Tim Mahoney – guitar
 SA Martinez – vocals
 P-Nut – bass
 Chad Sexton – drums

Certifications

References

2004 greatest hits albums
Albums produced by David Kahne
Albums produced by Eddy Offord
311 (band) compilation albums
Volcano Entertainment compilation albums